The Free Democrats (FREE DEMS) is a South African political party founded by neurologist Dr. Johan Reid to lobby for private health care, and is opposed to the government's proposed National Health Insurance. It is furthermore in favour of free enterprise, privatisation, private education and lower taxes.

Controversy  
Reid has previously been accused of sexual harassment, and has been found guilty of seven counts of unprofessional conduct by the Health Professions Council.

In August 2007, the Health Professions Council issued an apology for "incorrect information" published on their website regarding the guilty verdicts.

Election results

The party contested the 2019 general election at national level and in the Western Cape, failing to win a seat.

National elections

|-
! Election
! Total votes
! Share of vote
! Seats 
! +/–
! Government
|-
! 2019
| 2,580
| 0.01%
| 
| –
| 
|}

Provincial elections

! rowspan=2 | Election
! colspan=2 | Eastern Cape
! colspan=2 | Free State
! colspan=2 | Gauteng
! colspan=2 | Kwazulu-Natal
! colspan=2 | Limpopo
! colspan=2 | Mpumalanga
! colspan=2 | North-West
! colspan=2 | Northern Cape
! colspan=2 | Western Cape
|-
! % !! Seats
! % !! Seats
! % !! Seats
! % !! Seats
! % !! Seats
! % !! Seats
! % !! Seats
! % !! Seats
! % !! Seats
|-
! 2019
| - || -
| - || -
| - || -
| - || -
| - || -
| - || -
| - || -
| - || -
| 0.02% || 0/42
|}

References 

Political parties in South Africa
Libertarian parties